Sośnicki (feminine: Sośnicka; plural: Sośniccy) is a Polish surname. Notable people with the surname include:

People
 Stanisław Sośnicki (1896–1962), Polish military officer and athlete
 Zdzisława Sośnicka (born 1945), Polish singer

See also
 

Polish-language surnames